Primary Health Centre (PHCs), sometimes referred to as public health centres, are state-owned rural and urban health care facilities in India. They are essentially single-physician clinics usually with facilities for minor surgeries. They are part of the government-funded public health system in India and are the most basic units of this system. As on 31 March 2019 there are 30,045 PHCs in India in which 24,855 are located on rural areas and 5,190 are on urban areas. Suggest of PHC is given by Bhore committee in 1946.

Primary Health Centres programmes are listed below:
 Provision of medical care
 Maternal-child health including family planning
 Safe water supply and basic sanitation
 Prevention and control of locally endemic diseases
 Collection and reporting of vital statistics
 Education about health
 National health programmes, as relevant
 Referral services
 Training of health guides, health workers, local dais and health assistants
 Basic laboratory workers

 First PHC established in 1952.

See also
 Primary Health Care
 Mohalla Clinics
 Swachh Bharat Abhiyan
 Alma-Ata declaration
 Health care in India

References 

Health programmes in India